Citymail AB is a private postal organisation operating in Sweden (since 1991) and Denmark between 2007 and 2009, competing with the Swedish-Danish state-owned Postnord.

They specialize in direct mail and advertising.

External links
 
 Sustainability Report

Postal organizations
Marketing companies established in 1991
Swedish companies established in 1991